I Faked My Own Death is a documentary-miniseries on the Discovery Channel, originally aired on September 3, 2011, Three hour-long episodes were aired on Saturday nights for three weeks.  The final episode was shown on 17 September 2011.

Description

The show followed the stories of six different individuals who staged their own deaths at some point in their lives. The show attempted to go into the minds of the participants and find out what their motives were for committing death fraud.

The show premiered on 3 September 2011, featuring the story of Benjamin Holmes, the only one of the six not to have faced prison time due to the police corruption that caused him to go into hiding. The stories that followed featured convicted criminals and their tales of mistakes, legal troubles, and regrets.

Episode guide

See also
 List of premature obituaries
 Benjamin Holmes (death in absentia)
 Faked death
 Insurance Fraud

References

Discovery Channel original programming
2010s American documentary television series
2011 American television series debuts
2011 American television series endings